ABC 15 may refer to:

KNXV-TV, Phoenix, Arizona
KPOB-TV, Poplar Bluff, Missouri
WICD (TV), Champaign, Illinois
WPDE-TV, Florence, South Carolina